Javier Viveros (born 13 September 1977) is a Paraguayan writer, active member of Academia Paraguaya de la Lengua Española, corresponding member of Real Academia Española and former Vice-president of the Paraguayan Writers Society.

Life

He received a master's degree in Language and Literature from the National University of Asunción. He has traveled through several genres, among which it can be mentioned: poetry, short stories, children's literature, scripts for theater, comics and movies.

He regularly collaborates with the "Correo Semanal", a cultural supplement of the newspaper Última Hora. He has also worked as a university professor. His book of ñe'ẽnga (folkloric phrases) and the one of stories titled "Underneath the radar" were distributed to country level with the newspaper ABC Color. Also, the works A bed for Mimi and Alonsí were distributed through the "magic box", a product from the fast food multinational Burger King, thanks to the trades of the Alfaguara publishing house. Gunpowder and dust, the work of war cartoon about the Chaco War with scripts by Javier Viveros, was published in weekly fascicles by the newspaper Última Hora.

In the role of editor he has published Punta karaja, an anthology of Paraguayan football soccer stories. In addition, as publisher he has published the illustrated album, Mrs. Jurumi, under his own publishing label. He has written scripts and directed for the Servilibro publishing house the collection "Paraguayan Literature in Comic Strips", that took to the comics format several stories of great Paraguayan authors, among which Augusto Roa Bastos, Gabriel Casaccia, Helio Vera and Josefina Plá.

Either as a guest speaker or as a member of the official delegation of Paraguay, he has participated in book fairs in Resistencia (Argentina), Buenos Aires (Argentina), Santiago (Chile), Maldonado (Uruguay), La Paz (Bolivia) and Santo Domingo (Dominican Republic).

In 2012, his book of stories Handbook of fencing for elephants was published in Argentina by Ediciones Encendidas and in Spain by Ediciones Rubeo, in addition to the publication in Paraguay, by the publisher Arandurã. The Tokyo publisher Happa-no-kofu published a Japanese translation of the haikus in his book On a tile. It has been included in anthologies of Germany, Argentina, Chile, Cuba, Spain, Scotland, Paraguay and the Dominican Republic. The Chilean publisher "Cuarto propio" published For the love of the football: eleven cracks of fiction soccer, a collection of football soccer stories on a continental level (one story per country). His story "Football Soccer S.A." was selected to integrate this collection, which also includes writers like Juan Villoro (México) and Edmundo Paz Soldán (Bolivia). That work was translated into English and published as Idols and Underdogs, by the Scottish publisher "Freight Books."

The number 85 of the magazine Luvina (published by the University of Guadalajara) selected him among the most outstanding Latin American writers of less than 40 years of age. Regarding the selection criteria, the committee expresses "Luvina offers in this issue a collection of original voices that are accompanied and contrast each other, voices with bold proposals and contemporary literary structures, managing to settle the map of vicissitudes extended in this territory".

He was Vice-president of the Society of Writers of Paraguay from July 2016 to July 2018.

Bibliography
Short stories
 2008 - Ingenierías del insomnio
 2009 - Urbano, demasiado urbano
 2012 - Manual de esgrima para elefantes
 2015 - Fantasmario - Cuentos de la Guerra del Chaco
 2016 - Por debajo del radar - Antología personal
 2021 - Vríngo luisõ
 2021 - En curso de colisión
 2021 - Cartografía mínima de vidas ajenas
Poetry
 2007 - Dulce y doliente ayer
 2008 - En una baldosa
 2009 - Mensajeámena
 2009 - Panambi ku'i
Theatre
 2018 - Flores del yuyal
Children's literature
 2013 - Una cama para Mimi
 2014 - Alonsí
 2017 - Tana, la campana
 2017 - La señora Jurumi
 2018 - La carrera chaqueña
 2018 - Pepo y Lalo
 2018 - ¿De quién es esta pluma?
 2018 - Mymba saraki
 2018 - Siete cántaros de lluvia
 2018 - Alarma en el takuru
 2019 - Cinco dientes de león
 2019 - Mosi en el Chaco
 2019 - Los indomables
 2019 - Toni en las alturas
 2019 - Tres dinocuentos
 2019 - Luna y los fuegos artificiales
 2019 - Historias de Animalia
 2020 - Sonata para cigarra y piano
 2022 - La mudanza de Lito
 2022 - El tatakua de la abuela
 2022 - Lito y el poncho para'i
Comic
 2013 - Pólvora y polvo
 2015 - Epopeya - Guerra del Chaco
 2016 - Epopeya - Binacional
 2016 - Epopeya - Guerra Guasu
 2020 - Epopeya del 70
 2020 - Epopeya - Penurias y fatigas
Novel
 2019 - Réquiem del Chaco
 2019 - El burbujero maravilloso (with Diana Viveros)
Opera
 2021 - Cándido López
Biographies
2020 - Branislava Sušnik. La científica implacable
2020 - Silvio Pettirossi. El acróbata del aire
2020 - Serafina Dávalos. Pionera paraguaya del feminismo
2020 - Manuel Ortíz Guerrero. El poeta del pueblo
2021 - Arsenio Erico. El rey del gol
2021 - Gabriel Casaccia. Fundador de la narrativa paraguaya moderna

Awards and honours
 Finalist of the 2009 edition of the International Short Story Award "Juan Rulfo", with his short story "Misterio JFK", selected among the nearly six thousand texts sent to the contest.
 Honorable Mention in the "Roque Gaona" Prize, 2013 edition (Handbook of fencing for elephants).
 Second prize in the 1st edition of the International Screenwriting Competition "Roa Cinero", organized by the Roa Bastos Foundation.
 Panambi Honorific Award given by 26 Festival Internacional de Cine de Paraguay.
 "Edward and Lily Tuck Award for Paraguayan Literature 2018", given by the PEN Club of the United States to the book "Inventory of ghosts - Tales of the Chaco War" (Fantasmario).
 Finalist of "Concurso Regional de Nouvele EMR 2018", organized by Editorial Municipal de Rosario (Argentina), finalist book is the novel "De Sanctis".
 Roque Gaona Award 2018 for the book "Flores del yuyal".
 Honorable Mention in Premio Municipal de Literatura 2020 for "Réquiem del Chaco".
 Premio República "Luque 2022".

References

External links

 Official blog
 Profile in Paraguayan Writer's Society portal
 Profile in Portal Guaraní
 Interview to the author (in spanish)

1977 births
Living people
Paraguayan children's writers
21st-century Paraguayan writers
Universidad Nacional de Asunción alumni